The Kaimuki-McKinley-Roosevelt Complex Area is one of nine Hawaii Department of Education complex areas on the island of Oahu, Hawaii, USA. It is part of the Honolulu District and operates two community schools, three high schools, five middle schools, nineteen elementary schools, five public charter schools, and two special schools.

The current complex superintendent is Ruth Silberstein.

Community schools

High schools

Middle schools

Elementary schools

Charter schools

Special schools

Other Complex Areas

Honolulu District
Farrington-Kaiser-Kalani Complex Area

References

School Complex Areas in Hawaii